Abderrezak Bitam (born April 18, 1989, in Aïn Touta) is an Algerian football player who is currently playing for MSP Batna.

International career
On November 16, 2011, Bitam was selected as part of Algeria's squad for the 2011 CAF U-23 Championship in Morocco.

References

External links
 

1989 births
Living people
People from Aïn Touta
Algerian footballers
Algeria under-23 international footballers
JS Kabylie players
MSP Batna players
Algerian Ligue 2 players
Algeria youth international footballers
2011 CAF U-23 Championship players
Association football defenders
AS Aïn M'lila players
21st-century Algerian people